Caroline Mays Brevard (1860–1920) was an educator, historian and author in Brevard County, Florida. She was a history professor at Florida State College for Women (now part of Florida State University) She was added to the List of Great Floridians in 2012. She was a member of the Florida Historical Society and the group maintains a Caroline Mays Brevard Award in her honor.

Brevard was born at her aunt's residence at The Grove in Tallahassee on August 29, 1860. She was the daughter of Theodore Washington Brevard, Jr. and Mary Laura Call and the granddaughter of Florida Territorial Governor Richard Keith Call.

Brevard graduated from Columbia University and then returned home to Tallahassee, Florida where she taught at a Leon High School.  She published The History of Florida in 1904, a well regarded account of Florida's history. In 1915 she began teaching at the Florida State College for Women.

A large elementary school was built in 1924 and named in to honor her. It is now part of the Bloxham Building.

Bibliography
A history of Florida American book company 1904
A history of Florida from the treaty of 1763 to our own times (DeLand, Fla.: The Florida State Historical Society, 1924–25)
Literature of the South New York, Broadway Publishing, circa 1908

References

External links
 

1860 births
1920 deaths
Columbia University alumni
20th-century American historians
20th-century American women writers
Historians of Florida
Florida State University faculty
Local historians
People from Tallahassee, Florida
Writers from Tallahassee, Florida
American women historians
Historians from Florida